Wingham Colliery railway station was a railway station on the East Kent Light Railway in southeast England. It was intended to serve Wingham Colliery, a short distance to the south, but the mine was aborted without producing any coal. The railway then tried to develop a passenger business, extending the line towards Wingham Town with the long-term aim of reaching Canterbury, but ran out of money before they did so.

Today there is little trace of the station or the railway, other than a line of trees that follow the course of the old trackbed and define the edge of a field. The station buildings consisted of two small wooden structures on the north side of the track that were moved to Wingham Town when it was built; the site has now been landscaped into the field.

History
It opened on 16 October 1916 and the last passenger train ran on 30 October 1948. Wingham Colliery was not developed beyond a 50-foot shaft.

References

External links
 

Disused railway stations in Kent
Former East Kent Light Railway stations
Railway stations in Great Britain opened in 1916
Railway stations in Great Britain closed in 1948